The Cuterebrinae, the robust bot flies, are a subfamily of Oestridae which includes large, parasitic flies; this group has historically been treated as a family, but all recent classifications place them firmly within the Oestridae. Both genera spend their larval stages in the skin of mammals. The genus Cuterebra, or rodent bots, attack rodents and similar animals. The other genus, Dermatobia, attacks primates, including humans.

See also 
 Cuterebriasis

References

External links 
 

Oestridae
Parasitic flies
Brachycera subfamilies